Hesperus is an unincorporated community and a U.S. Post Office in La Plata County, Colorado, United States. The Hesperus Post Office has the ZIP Code 81326.

A post office called Hesperus has been in operation since 1891. The community takes its name from nearby Hesperus Mountain.

Geography
Hesperus is located at  (37.286619,-108.039036).

Hesperus Baptist Church

See also

 Durango Micropolitan Statistical Area
 Old Spanish National Historic Trail

References

External links

Unincorporated communities in La Plata County, Colorado
Unincorporated communities in Colorado